The 2009 Liège–Bastogne–Liège monument classic cycling race took place on April 26, 2009. It was the 95th running of Liège–Bastogne–Liège. Luxembourg's Andy Schleck produced a solo breakaway to beat a strong field and win the race.

Results

References

External links

Liège–Bastogne–Liège
Liege-bastogne-liege, 2009
Liege